is a 2010 Japanese psychological thriller directed by Hideo Nakata. The movie is based on Honobu Yonezawa's novel The Incite Mill.

Plot
Ten people are promised a dream job that pays 112,000 yen ($1,236 US dollars) per hour, no experience or qualifications necessary. They are then taken to a remote underground complex where they are locked up and forced to participate in a murderous game that will last for seven days.

Cast
 Tatsuya Fujiwara as Rikuhiko Yuki
 Haruka Ayase as Shoko Suwana
 Satomi Ishihara as Miya Sekimizu
 Aya Hirayama as Wakana Tachibana
 Shinji Takeda as Sousuke Iwai
 Tsuyoshi Abe as Yudai Osako
 Kin'ya Kitaōji as Yoshi Ando
 Nagisa Katahira as Sawako Fuchi
 Takurō Ōno as Yukito Maki
 Masanori Ishii as Munehiro Nishino
 Yuki Furukawa as Indian Doll (voice)
 Daisuke Kikuta

Theme music
Song title: "Shinjitemiru" (シンジテミル), translates to "See the Truth"
Label: Victor Entertainment (VTCL-35101)
Release date: October 13, 2010
This is Nakabayashi Mei's 3rd single release under her stage name of May'n.

Production
On 18 January 2010 Horipro confirmed Hideo Nakata as director of the film adaptation of the 2007 mystery novel Inshite Miru (The Incite Mill) by Honobu Yonezawa. Shooting began in March 2010. Tatsuya Fujiwara, Haruka Ayase and Satomi Ishihara were cast in the leading roles. Satoshi Suzuki wrote the screenplay.

Release
The film was released in Japanese theaters on 16 October 2010.

References

External links
 
 
 
 J'Lit | Publications : The Incite Mill | Books from Japan 

2010 films
2010 psychological thriller films
2010s Japanese-language films
Films based on Japanese novels
Films directed by Hideo Nakata
Warner Bros. films
Fiction about curses
Films about death games
Films scored by Kenji Kawai
Japanese psychological thriller films
2010s Japanese films